is a Japanese actress and model. Her acting roles have included Tokiko Sukegawa in the 96th NHK asadora Hiyokko and Yui Shida in the Fuji TV series Transit Girls.

Early life 
Sakuma was born in Kanagawa Prefecture on March 10, 1995.

Career 
In 2013, Sakuma auditioned as an exclusive model for the fashion magazine Vivi. She won the Girls Award '13A/W on September 28 of the same year, and first appeared on Vivi'''s December 2013 issue. She made her acting debut with Tao Tsuchiya in the 2014 film Jinrō Game Beast Side. She later starred in the 2015 Fuji Television drama Transit Girls. In 2017 she played the role of Tokiko Sukegawa in the 96th NHK asadora Hiyokko''.

Personal life 
On December 31, 2022, Sakuma announced that she is married with actor Go Ayano.

Filmography

Magazines

Films

TV series

Advertisements

Awards

References

External links

 

Japanese female models
1995 births
Living people
Actresses from Kanagawa Prefecture
Models from Kanagawa Prefecture